Delsa Jennifer Solórzano Bernal (born 15 November 1971) is a Venezuelan lawyer and politician. She is currently a deputy of the National Assembly and president of the Internal Affairs Parliamentary Commission, as well as vice president of the Parliamentary Human Rights Commission of the  Inter-Parliamentary Union. As of the 13th of December 2018, she is founder and president of the political party

Early life and career
Delsa Jennifer Solórzano Bernal was born on the 15th of November 1971. She studied a degree at the Universidad Central de Venezuela in Criminology and Law.

National Assembly and Un Nuevo Tiempo
During the Venezuelan presidential crisis, she worked on the Amnesty Law for Juan Guaido, serving as deputy of the Latin American Parliament in the 2011-2016 period.

Originally, she was appointed vice president of the social democrat opposition party Un Nuevo Tiempo, from which she separated on 4 December 2018.

Encuentro Ciudadano

Personal life 
She is married to the lawyer Luis Izquiel and mother of a child.

References

External links 
 Blog

21st-century Venezuelan women politicians
21st-century Venezuelan politicians
Members of the National Assembly (Venezuela)
A New Era politicians
Central University of Venezuela alumni
1971 births
Living people
Venezuelan women lawyers